The Constitution of the United Arab Emirates provides a legal and political framework for the operation of the United Arab Emirates (UAE) as a federation of seven emirates. The Constitution came into effect on 2 December 1971 and was permanently accepted in May 1996. Authored by Adi Bitar, a forming judge and legal advisor, the Constitution is written in 10 parts and has 152 Articles. The United Arab Emirates celebrates the formation of the Union (and acceptance of the federal constitution) as National Day.

History 

The Historically independent kingdoms, the modern emirates that constitute the United Arab Emirates and the modern kingdoms of Qatar and Bahrain entered into a treaty with the United Kingdom in 1853 and agreed to a Perpetual Maritime Truce with the UK; the kingdoms were collectively referred to as the Trucial States or as Trucial Oman. Disputes between the states were often arbitrated by the United Kingdom. In the late 1960s, the Trucial States Council was formed by the emirates, as well as Qatar and Bahrain. The United Kingdom announced its decision to end the treaty relationships with the kingdoms in 1968. The nine kingdoms attempted to form a union of Arab Emirates, but were unable to agree upon the terms of the union.  While Bahrain and Qatar became independent countries, the other seven emirates attempted to form a temporary, federal union in 1971.

In 1971, the Constitution, authored by Judge Adi Bitar, was established as a temporary legal and political framework.  Article 9 of the Constitution states that the Capital shall be a new town on the border of Dubai and Abu Dhabi, to be completed within seven years and to be called "Al Karama"; however, a provision in the same article provided for Abu Dhabi to be the "temporary" capital of the Union and for Sheikh Zayed bin Sultan Al Nahyan, ruler of Abu Dhabi, to be the President of the United Arab Emirates.
 
In 1979, a draft "permanent" constitution was prepared which allowed for the creation of a unified military and judicial system. Initially, the emirate of Dubai was strongly opposed to the unification of the military forces and, along with Ras al Khaimah, refused to attend Supreme Council meetings of the union.  Mediations by Saudi Arabia and Kuwait as well as by other UAE rulers reduced differences between Shiekh Rashid bin Saeed Al Maktoum, ruler of Dubai and Sheikh Zayed bin Sultan Al Nahyan, ruler of Abu Dhabi.

In 1994, Abu Dhabi was made the permanent capital of the UAE, and in May 1996, six years after Rashid bin Saeed al Maktoum's death, Dubai agreed to a permanent constitution, and one that would unify the armed forces of the UAE.  However, Dubai, like Ras al Khaimah, maintains its own judicial courts, which are not subject to governance from the Supreme Court of the UAE.

Preamble 

The preamble of the constitution declares the intent of the rulers of six emirates (Ras al Khaimah joined the Union on 10 February 1972) to form a "comprehensive, democratic regime" in an "Islamic, Arab society".

Parts of the Constitution 
Some of the important Articles and Parts of the Constitution are listed below:

Part one
 Article 7 — Islam is the official state religion, Islamic Sharia the primary source of legislation
 Article 9 — Abu Dhabi is the capital of the Union.  (The original constitution stated that Abu Dhabi was the temporary capital until the completion of Al Karama; however, the qualification was removed in Constitutional Amendment No. (1) dated 02/12/1996.)
 Article 10 — aim of the Union is the maintenance of its independence and sovereignty
 Article 11 — the Union forms a single economic and customs entity; free movement of all capital and goods between emirates is guaranteed; all inter-emirate taxes, duties and tolls are abolished
 Article 12 — Foreign policy will be to support Arab and Islamic causes and consolidation of friendship and co-operation with all nations on the basis of the Charter of the United Nations
Part Two: Fundamental Social and Economic Basis of the Union
 Article 14 — Equality, social justice, ensuring safety and security and equality of opportunity for all citizens
 Article 15 — The family is the basis of society. It is founded on morality, religion, ethics and patriotism. The law shall guarantee its existence, safeguard and protect it from corruption
 Article 17 — Compulsory education at the primary level
 Article 21 — Private property will be protected
 Article 22 — The protection of public property is the duty of every citizen
Part Three: Freedom, Rights and Public Duties
 Article 25 — All persons are equal before the law, without distinction between citizens of the Union in regard to race, nationality, religious belief or social status.
 Personal liberty is guaranteed; no person may be arrested, searched, detained or imprisoned except in accordance with the provisions of law
 Article 28 — penalty is personal; an accused shall be innocent until proven guilty
 Article 29 — freedom of movement is guaranteed, within limits of the law
 Article 30 — freedom of expression is guaranteed, within limits of the law
 Article 32 — freedom to exercise religious worship is guaranteed in accordance with established customs and provided it does not conflict with public policy or violate public morals
 Article 33 — freedom of assembly is guaranteed, within limits of the law
Part Four: Union Authorities
 Article 45 — establishes the Supreme Council of the Union (SCN), the Council of Ministers, the National Assembly and the Judiciary.
 National Assembly composition: 8 seats each of Abu Dhabi and Dubai, 6 each for Sharjah and Ras al Khaimah, and 4 each for Ajman, Umm al Quwain and Fujairah
 Articles 51 and 52 — election and term of office of President and Vice President
 Article 108 — The President is required to confirm all death sentences imposed by a Union judicial authority
Part Five: Union Legislation and Decrees and the Authorities having Jurisdiction therein
Part Six: The Emirates
 Article 123 — the emirates may retain their individual memberships to OPEC
Part Seven
 Islam is the official religion of the Union. The Islamic Sharia shall be a main source of legislation in the Union. The official language of the Union is Arabic .
Part Eight: Financial Affairs of the Union
Part Nine: Armed Forces and Security Forces
 Article 137 — Any attack on one emirate is an attack on all emirates and upon the existence of the Union
 Article 138 — establishment of a unified air force, navy and land army
Part Ten: Final and Transitional Provisions
 Article 145 — Constitution cannot be suspended except when martial law is in effect

References 

C
1971 in law